The year 1741 in architecture involved some significant events.

Buildings and structures

Buildings

 Auberge de Castille in Valletta, Malta, remodelled to a plan attributed to Andrea Belli.
 New building for the Royal Infirmary of Edinburgh in Scotland, designed by William Adam, opens.
 Mineral Water Hospital, Bath, England, designed by John Wood, the Elder, completed
 North Parade, Bath, designed by John Wood, completed about this date.
 Santissimo Nome di Maria al Foro Traiano in Rome, designed by Antoine Derizet, completed about this date.
 Construction begins on the following Palladian style buildings
 The Berlin Court Opera, to a design by Georg Wenzeslaus von Knobelsdorff.
 Russborough House in Ireland, to a design by Richard Cassels.
 Construction begins on Wissembourg's city hall

Births
 April 1 – George Dance the Younger, English architect (d. 1825)
 October 3 – Johann Christian von Mannlich, German painter and architect (d. 1822)
 December 16 – Erik Palmstedt, Swedish architect (d. 1803)

Deaths
 May 3 – Josef Munggenast, Austrian architect (b. 1680)
 October 13 – Jean Aubert, French architect (b. c.1680)

Architecture
Years in architecture
18th-century architecture